The list below gives German names and Czech names of towns along with county names and other information in the Sudetenland from World War I through the era of World War II known as interwar Czechoslovakia.

Southern Sudetenland 

Sudetenland